SLW or slw may refer to:

Aviation
 Saltillo Airport (IATA code), Mexico

Other uses
 Sialum language (ISO 639 code:slw)
 slw, a PowerPC logical shift operator
 Sanskrit loan-word; See Kappe Arabhatta

See also
 SLW Ranch, an historic ranch in Colorado, US
 EuroStar SLW, an Evektor SportStar aircraft variant